This article lists the highest natural elevation of each sovereign state on the continent of Europe defined physiographically.

Not all points in this list are mountains or hills, some are simply elevations that are not distinguishable as geographical features.

Notes are provided where territorial disputes or inconsistencies affect the listings. Some countries such as Denmark (Greenland), Netherlands (Saba), Spain (Canary Islands) and Portugal (Azores Islands) have part of their territory and their high points outside of Europe; their non-European high points are mentioned in the Notes.

For more details about Serbian and Kosovan highest points and ranks, see list of mountains in Kosovo.

Three other entries of partially recognized countries with highest points in Europe are listed and ranked in italics. For more details see list of states with limited recognition.

See also
List of elevation extremes by country
Geography of Europe
Lists of mountains by region#Europe – a list of European mountain lists
Extreme points of Europe
List of highest points of African countries
List of highest points of Asian countries

Notes

References
CIA World Factbook

Geography of Europe
 Highest